The 1905 Wyoming Cowboys football team represented the University of Wyoming as an independent during the 1905 college football season. In its sixth season under head coach William McMurray, the team compiled a 3–4 record and was outscored by a total of 162 to 63. Herbert Kennedy was the team captain.

Schedule

References

Wyoming
Wyoming Cowboys football seasons
Wyoming Cowboys football